The Hilliker Curse: My Pursuit of Women is a work of memoir and autobiography by American author James Ellroy published in 2010. Ellroy dedicated the memoir "To Erika Schickel." The epigraph for The Hilliker Curse: My Pursuit of Women is "I will take Fate by the throat. —Ludwig van Beethoven." The unabridged audiobook version is narrated by Ellroy himself.

The Hilliker Curse: My Pursuit of Women chronicles Ellroy's childhood, his confession of guilt over wishing his mother- Geneva Odelia (née Hilliker) Ellroy- dead, his wild teen life, love affairs, marriages, and finally, his finding of an extraordinary woman whom Ellroy refers to as "Her." It is a narrative of emotion, insight, sexuality, and spiritual quest.

Books by James Ellroy
American autobiographies
2010 non-fiction books
Books about writers